Hiler is an unincorporated community in Jackson County, in the U.S. state of Missouri.

History
A post office called Hiler was established in 1893, and remained in operation until 1902. The community was named after the maiden name of the wife of a first settler.

References

Unincorporated communities in Jackson County, Missouri
Unincorporated communities in Missouri